North Dakota Highway 16 (ND 16) is a  north–south state highway in the U.S. state of North Dakota. ND 16's southern terminus is at the end of state maintenance south of Golva, and the northern terminus is at ND 68 southeast of Alexander.

Major intersections

References

016
Transportation in Golden Valley County, North Dakota
Transportation in McKenzie County, North Dakota